Huron School District may refer to:

 Huron School District (Michigan)
 Huron School District (South Dakota)
 Huron City School District